Pirri is a Spanish former footballer (born 1945)

Pirri  may also refer to:
 Pirri (footballer, born 1970), a Spanish former footballer
 Pirri (surname), Italian surname
 Pirri (Cagliari), district of Cagliari, Italy